The 2001 Slough Borough Council election was held on 7 June 2001, at the same time as other local elections across England and Northern Ireland, and on the same day as the general election. Fourteen of the 41 seats on Slough Borough Council were up for election, being the usual third of the council.

Results
The elected councillors were:

Notes:-
 Member of the Britwellian, Independent, Liberal and Liberal Democrat Group (BILLD)
 (a) Parmar: Formerly served as a councillor 1995–2000

References

Slough
2001 English local elections
2001